Shyamoupti Mudly (born 4 November 2002)  is an Indian actress who works in Bengali television industry. She is well known for portraying the female lead roles of Minu and Tara in the serials Bajlo Tomar Alor Benu and Dhrubatara respectively, both of these aired on the general entertainment pay television channel Star Jalsha.

Filmography

Television

Films
Bultir Result (2020)

References

External links
 

Bengali television actresses
21st-century Indian actresses
Living people
2002 births